Michael Kofi Ahey (born 22 November 1939) is a Ghanaian former sprinter and long jumper who competed in the 1964 Summer Olympics, in the 1968 Summer Olympics, and in the 1972 Summer Olympics.

References

1939 births
Living people
Ghanaian male sprinters
Ghanaian male long jumpers
Olympic athletes of Ghana
Athletes (track and field) at the 1964 Summer Olympics
Athletes (track and field) at the 1968 Summer Olympics
Athletes (track and field) at the 1972 Summer Olympics
Commonwealth Games gold medallists for Ghana
Commonwealth Games silver medallists for Ghana
Commonwealth Games medallists in athletics
Athletes (track and field) at the 1962 British Empire and Commonwealth Games
Athletes (track and field) at the 1970 British Commonwealth Games
Medallists at the 1962 British Empire and Commonwealth Games
Medallists at the 1970 British Commonwealth Games